Strong Lebanon is the parliamentary bloc of the Free Patriotic Movement in the Lebanese Parliament. Headed by Gebran Bassil, it consists of 29 deputies after the 2018 general election.

References 

Free Patriotic Movement politicians
March 8 Alliance
Lebanese politicians

Parliamentary blocs of Lebanon